The men's 3000 metres steeplechase event at the 1998 World Junior Championships in Athletics was held in Annecy, France, at Parc des Sports on 30 July and 1 August.

Medalists

Results

Final
1 August

Heats
30 July

Heat 1

Heat 2

Heat 3

Participation
According to an unofficial count, 37 athletes from 26 countries participated in the event.

References

3000 metres steeplechasechase
Steeplechase at the World Athletics U20 Championships